Ian Gibson is a Scottish former footballer, who played as a striker.

Football career
Gibson began his professional career at the Scottish Highland League club Nairn County. He then moved to Aberdeen in 1975, making his debut in the 2–0 win over Dumbarton. He remained there for a further three seasons, until he moved to Kilmarnock in 1978. Gibson made seventy appearances for Kilmarnock, scoring twelve goals. Gibson played in the Australian National Soccer League (NSL) for Canberra City between 1981 and 1986, scoring 28 times in 137 appearances.

Career after football

A graduate of the Aberdeen University, he moved to Australia in 1981 where he began a career in teaching. For nine years he worked at the Academy of Interactive Entertainment as head of school. He now lives in Canberra, Australia.

References

External links
Ian Gibson at Aussie Footballers

Scottish footballers
Living people
Association football midfielders
Nairn County F.C. players
Aberdeen F.C. players
Kilmarnock F.C. players
Scottish Football League players
1956 births
Scottish emigrants to Australia
National Soccer League (Australia) players
Canberra City FC players